El Gato Negro, Spanish for The Black Cat, may refer to:

In comics
El Gato Negro, the name of two fictional superheroes created by Richard Dominguez
Agustin Guerrero, the first character to become El Gato Negro
Francisco Guerrero, the second and current El Gato Negro
El Gato Negro (comic book), the original comic book series to feature the characters
El Gato Negro: Nocturnal Warrior, the second comic book series, featuring the current El Gato Negro

In music

"El Gato Negro" (song), a song by Ruben Ramos and The Mexican Revolution
Ruben Ramos, nicknamed "El Gato Negro" because of the song
Gato Negro, an album by 7 Year Bitch

People
René Velázquez Valenzuela (died 2016), Mexican suspected assassin nicknamed El Gato Negro.

Other
 Gato Negro station, metro station in Caracas

See also
Gato (disambiguation)